Empire Beauty may refer to a number of things.

, a ship built in 1943 and scrapped in 1969.
Empire Beauty Schools,  a cosmetology school in the USA founded in 1948